Muizenberg comprises a 150 ha wetland area, including an intermittent shallow lake (Muizenberg) and a smaller pond (Kaya Fortuna). The site lies within the northern suburbs of Willemstad, the capital of Curaçao, a constituent island nation of the Kingdom of the Netherlands in the Dutch Caribbean. In 1915, Shell Curaçao built the Muizenberg dam to collect water for cooling. The artificial lake which was created started to attract a large population of birds.

It has been identified as an Important Bird Area by BirdLife International because it supports American coots. Common moorhens, pied-billed grebes and white-cheeked pintails breed there and American flamingos feed there. The 65 ha Muizenberg lake has been recognised as a wetland of international importance by designation as a Ramsar site.

References

Important Bird Areas of the Dutch Caribbean
Birds of Curaçao
Bodies of water of Curaçao
Protected areas of Curaçao
Ramsar sites in the Netherlands